Communications Chemistry is a peer-reviewed, open access, scientific journal in the field chemistry published by Nature Portfolio since 2018. The chief editor is Victoria Richards. Communications Chemistry was created as a sub-journal to Nature Communications along with Communications Biology and Communications Physics.

Abstracting and indexing 
The journal is abstracted and indexed in:

According to the Journal Citation Reports, the journal has a 2021 impact factor of 7.211, ranking it 43rd out of 179 journals in the category "Chemistry, Multidisciplinary".

See also
Nature
Nature Communications
Scientific Reports

References

External links

Nature Research academic journals
Chemistry journals
Open access journals
Publications established in 2018
English-language journals
Creative Commons-licensed journals
Continuous journals
2018 establishments